is a railway station in the Kamiōsaki district of Shinagawa, Tokyo, close to the boundary with Meguro ward.

Lines
Meguro Station is served by the following lines:
East Japan Railway Company (JR East) Yamanote Line
Tokyo Metro Namboku Line - through service with Tokyu Meguro Line
Toei Mita Line - through service with Tokyu Meguro Line
Tokyu Meguro Line - through service with Tokyo Metro Namboku Line and Toei Mita Line

Station layout
The JR East part of the station consists of one island platform serving two tracks. It also has a "Midori no Madoguchi" staffed ticket office and a View Plaza travel agency. The combined Tokyu, Tokyo Metro, and Toei part of the station consists of an island platform located on the 4th basement ("4BF") level.

JR East platforms

Tokyu/Toei/Tokyo Metro platforms

History
The JR East station (originally Nippon Railway station) opened on 16 March 1885. The Namboku Line and Mita Line subway station opened on 26 September 2000.

The station facilities of the Namboku Line were inherited by Tokyo Metro after the privatization of the Teito Rapid Transit Authority (TRTA) in 2004.

Half-height platform edge doors were installed on the two Yamanote Line platforms from 28 August 2010.

Station numbering was introduced to the JR East platforms in 2016 with Meguro being assigned station number "JY22".

Passenger statistics
In fiscal 2013, the JR East station was used by an average of 106,538 passengers daily (boarding passengers only), making it the 31st-busiest JR East station. Over the same fiscal year, the Tokyu station was used by an average of 248,074 passengers daily, making it the busiest station on the Meguro Line. In fiscal 2013, the Toei station was used by an average of 42,647 passengers daily (boarding passengers only). In fiscal 2013, the Tokyo Metro station was used by an average of 102,998 passengers daily. Note that the statistics consider passengers who travel through Meguro station on a through service as users of the station, even if they did not disembark at the station.

The daily passenger figures for JR East, Tokyu and Tokyo Metro in previous years are as shown below.

 Note that JR East figures are for boarding passengers only.

See also

 List of railway stations in Japan

References

External links

 JR East Meguro Station information 
 Tokyu Meguro Station information 
 Tokyo Metro Meguro Station information 
 Toei Metro Meguro Station information 

Yamanote Line
Tokyu Meguro Line
Tokyo Metro Namboku Line
Toei Mita Line
Stations of East Japan Railway Company
Stations of Tokyu Corporation
Stations of Tokyo Metro
Stations of Tokyo Metropolitan Bureau of Transportation
Railway stations in Tokyo
Railway stations in Japan opened in 1885